Tove Styrke is the self-titled debut studio album by Swedish electropop singer Tove Styrke. The album was released on 12 November 2010 on Sony Music. It debuted at number 21 in Swedish charts and went up to 10th place in its second week. Most tracks have been written by Tove Styrke, Patrik Berger, Peter Ågren and Janne Kask. On 10 October 2011, the album was re-released with the new single "Call My Name" and a 2011 remake of "High and Low".
After promoting and releasing the single "Call My Name" across Europe, the album got reissued another time.

Track listing

Release history

Singles
The first single "Million Pieces" was released on 9 July 2010. It has been written by Adam Olenius from Shout Out Louds and Lykke Li.
The second single, "White Light Moment", was released on 19 November 2011. It charted at number five on the Swedish top singles chart and has been certified gold.
In February 2011, Tove Styrke issued the third single, "High and Low", she released an EP featuring six remixes of the track.
"Call My Name" was released as the fourth single in Sweden (22 August 2011) while the album got reissued. "Call My Name" served as first single release in Europe. It was released on 3 February 2012 in Germany.
"Bad Time for a Good Time (feat. Gnucci Banana)" was released as digital single on 15 February 2012 in Scandinavia, within the following months it was released internationally.

Charts

Weekly charts

Year-end charts

References

2010 debut albums
Tove Styrke albums